Batesville High School is a public secondary school that is located in the city of Batesville, Arkansas, in Independence County. Their mascot for the school is the Pioneer. The school colors are orange and black. Batesville High has been awarded National Blue Ribbon School status. It is a part of the Batesville School District.

History 
The original facility created as Batesville High School has ties to the city's School Addition Historic District, which is listed on the National Register of Historic Places.

In 2021 the current campus had over 1,400 solar panels as part of the district's solar panel initiative.

Curriculum 

The assumed course of study at Batesville High School is the Smart Core curriculum developed by the Arkansas Department of Education (ADE). Students engage in regular and Advanced Placement (AP) coursework and exams prior to graduation. Batesville is a charter member and accredited by AdvancED (formerly North Central Association) since 1924.

In addition to its 2008 National Blue Ribbon School designation, Batesville High School was recognized nationally with the Bronze Award from the U.S. News & World Report Best High Schools ranking program. In 2006, student Ticy P. Browny was honored as a Scholar of the Presidential Scholars Program.

Athletics 
Batesville High School competes in football, girls' basketball, baseball, golf, tennis, swimming, softball, track, soccer, skeet shooting, archery, bowling, and volleyball, among others.  In most sports, the Pioneers compete in the 5A-East Conference as administered by the Arkansas Activities Association.

In 2003, the football team won the Class AAAA State Championship.

Since 1993 the baseball team has won 5 state titles.  Notable Pioneers are Chris Westervelt and Dan Wright.  Both Wright and Westervelt had successful careers in professional baseball, with Wright as a starting pitcher for the Chicago White Sox before injuries ended his career.

The Girls' Cross Country Team has won 7 straight 5A Cross Country Championships (2004–2010), and the Girls' Track team has won 4 consecutive state titles.  Girls' Track has won 7 state titles since 1983.

The Batesville Girls' Basketball team had an impressive run of success from 1982 to 1992, winning 5 state championships (82, 83, 88, 91, 92) and one overall state championship (1983).

Notable former pupils
Mark Martin, former race car driver and member of the NASCAR Hall of Fame.
Skip Rutherford (born 1950), first president of the Clinton Foundation, Dean of the University of Arkansas Clinton School of Public Service

References

External links 

Public high schools in Arkansas
Schools in Independence County, Arkansas
Educational institutions established in 1915
1915 establishments in Arkansas
Buildings and structures in Batesville, Arkansas